Eugene Charles (short name "Gene") Ulrich (born November 5, 1938) is an American Dead Sea scrolls scholar and the John A. O'Brien Professor emeritus of Hebrew Scripture and Theology in the Department of Theology at the University of Notre Dame. He is chief editor of the biblical texts of the Dead Sea scrolls and one of the three general editors of the Scrolls International Publication Project.  Ulrich has worked under two editors in chief on the scrolls project, namely John Strugnell and Emanuel Tov.

Biography
Eugene Ulrich was born in Louisville, Kentucky.

Education 
Ulrich has the following degrees: Litt.B., Xavier University. From 1964 he holds his Ph.L. from Loyola University. In 1970 he earned his M.Div. at Woodstock College. He then entered Harvard University and obtained his M.A. in 1967 and in 1975 his Ph.D.

Academic work 
Ulrich co-authored The Dead Sea Scrolls Bible with Martin Abegg and Peter Flint. He is also a member of the translation teams of the New Revised Standard Version of the Bible, the Modern English Version, and the New American Bible. He is a specialist in the texts of the Septuagint, the Dead Sea Scrolls and the Hebrew Scriptures.

As Chief Editor of the Dead Sea Scrolls he published five volumes of critical editions in Discoveries in the Judaean Desert (Oxford) and was an Area Editor for Oxford's Encyclopedia of the Dead Sea Scrolls. Appointed to the Grinfield Lecturership at the University of Oxford (1998-2000), he was twice elected as President of the International Organization for Septuagint and Cognate Studies and was invited as a Fellow of the Institute for Advanced Studies at the Hebrew University of Jerusalem. Recently, he was elected as President of the Catholic Biblical Association and as a Fellow of the American Academy of Arts and Sciences.

Awards 
Ulrich received the Award Medal of the University of Helsinki, a Guggenheim Fellowship, and several grants from the National Endowment for the Humanities.

In 1981 he received the Guggenheim Fellowship.
In 2001 he received the Fellow of the American Academy of Arts and Sciences's award.

Publications
 Discoveries in the Judaean Desert, Volume XII. Qumran Cave 4: VII: Genesis to Numbers Edited by Eugene Ulrich, Frank Moore Cross and James R. Davila, Published by the Oxford University Press
 The Dead Sea Scrolls Bible, Eugene Ulrich, Martin Abegg and Peter Flint, Published by HarperCollins
 Modern English Version: Amos, Edited by Eugene Ulrich, Stanley M. Horton and James F. Linzey, Published by Passio

References

External links
 Professor Ulrich recent publications
 Professor Ulrich's bio on the University of Notre Dame website

People from Louisville, Kentucky
Religious studies scholars
Roman Catholic biblical scholars
American biblical scholars
Old Testament scholars
Xavier University alumni
Harvard University alumni
University of Notre Dame faculty
Dead Sea Scrolls
Translators of the Bible into English
Fellows of the American Academy of Arts and Sciences
1938 births
Living people
Woodstock College alumni